Aghbolagh-e Hoseyn Khan (also Romanized as Āghbolāgh-e Ḩoseyn Khān; also known as Āqbolāgh-e Ḩoseyn Khān) is a village in Seylatan Rural District, in the Central District of Bijar County, Kurdistan Province, Iran. At the 2006 census, its population was 123, in 29 families. The village is populated by Azerbaijanis with a Kurdish minority.

References 

Towns and villages in Bijar County
Azerbaijani settlements in Kurdistan Province
Kurdish settlements in Kurdistan Province